Woodbay was an unincorporated community and coal town in Raleigh County, West Virginia.

References 

Unincorporated communities in West Virginia
Unincorporated communities in Raleigh County, West Virginia
Coal towns in West Virginia